Dannon Ross Atkins (born August 7, 1973) is an American baseball executive. On December 3, 2015, he was named the general manager of the Toronto Blue Jays, after having worked for the Cleveland Indians for 15 years.

Playing career
Atkins was a pitcher at Coral Gables Senior High School in Coral Gables, Florida, a city adjacent to Miami. After graduating in 1991, Atkins was a pitcher at Wake Forest University, and was drafted by the Florida Marlins in the 69th round of the 1994 Major League Baseball draft, but did not sign. In the 1995 Major League Baseball draft, the Cleveland Indians selected him in the 38th round, and he signed with the team. He played 5 seasons in Cleveland's minor league organization before retiring, compiling a career 37–32 win–loss record, 4.13 earned run average (ERA), and 340 strikeouts in 512 innings pitched.

Executive career

Cleveland Indians
The Indians hired Atkins in 2001 as assistant director of player development, and was promoted to director of Latin American operations in 2003. In 2006, they promoted him to director of player development. The Indians promoted Atkins to vice president of player personnel after the 2014 season.

Toronto Blue Jays
Mark Shapiro, who was hired as the Blue Jays' team president and CEO on October 31, 2015, hired Atkins as general manager on December 3. He replaced Tony LaCava, who served as interim GM in November. During the offseason leading into the 2016 season, Atkins made several moves, including selecting Joe Biagini in the Rule 5 draft, trading Ben Revere to the Washington Nationals for Drew Storen, and signing several players to minor league contracts with invitations to spring training. In his first draft as GM, Atkins selected T. J. Zeuch in the first round. Atkins made several additions to the Blue Jays roster prior to the trade deadline, acquiring Melvin Upton Jr., Joaquín Benoit, Scott Feldman, Francisco Liriano, and others, which aided the Blue Jays in making the postseason for the second consecutive season with an 89-73 record.

Atkins' second season was a disappointing one for the Jays. They finished 76-86 despite early season hopes of a third consecutive playoff berth. The 2018 season saw more of the same, as the Jays stumbled to a 73-89 record and a second straight season out of the postseason leading to Atkins beginning a rebuild of the roster.

On April 7, 2021, it was announced that the Blue Jays organization signed Atkins to a five year contract extension, to the end of the 2026 season.

References

External links

Living people
1973 births
Akron Aeros players
American expatriate baseball people in Canada
Baseball players from Greensboro, North Carolina
Baseball pitchers
Cleveland Indians executives
Columbus Red Stixx players
Kinston Indians players
Major League Baseball general managers
Sportspeople from Greensboro, North Carolina
Toronto Blue Jays executives
Wake Forest Demon Deacons baseball players
Watertown Indians players